"It'll Be Her" is a song written by Billy Ray Reynolds and originally recorded by Johnny Cash for his 1978 album Gone Girl.

Released in November 1978 as the album's second single (Columbia 3-10855, with "It Comes and Goes" on the opposite side), the song reached number 89 on U.S. Billboard country chart.

Track listing

Charts

References

External links 
 "It'll Be Her" on the Johnny Cash official website

Johnny Cash songs
1978 songs
1978 singles

Columbia Records singles